The Women’s European Boxing Championships was hosted and organised by the Romania Boxing Association in Romania in 2014. The event was held in Bucharest in Romania from May 31–June 7.

The tournament was organised in association with the European Boxing Confederation (EUBC).

Contestants
The organisers of the event expect to welcome women boxers, competing in 10 different weight classes.

Medal table

Medal winners

References

External links 
Official Results

Women's European Amateur Boxing Championships
Boxing
Boxing
Sports competitions in Bucharest
European
Women's European Amateur Boxing Championships
Women's European Amateur Boxing Championships
2010s in Bucharest